Rugby sevens at the 2023 European Games will be held in Kraków, Poland.
The gold medalists in the men’s and women’s tournaments will qualifiy for the 2024 Summer Olympics.

Qualification

Men's

Women's

References

External links
 

Rugby
European Championships, Team
Rugby
Europe
Rugby
Rugby Sevens Championships, Team